The Jinnah Memorial Mosque is a mosque in Saint Joseph, Tunapuna–Piarco Region, Trinidad and Tobago.

History
The construction of the mosque started in 1947 after the British Windward Islands government granted a piece of land to the Trinidad Muslim League (TML). The construction was completed in 1954 with funds from Moulvi Ameer Ali, the founder of TML, and the group supporters.

Architecture
The mosque was designed by British architect. It consists of large and small domes on its rooftop with two minarets. Metal staircases were installed inside the two towers that go up to the top of the structure. The mosque can accommodate up to 1,000 worshippers.

See also
 Islam in Trinidad and Tobago

References

1954 establishments in Trinidad and Tobago
Mosques completed in 1954
Mosques in Trinidad and Tobago
Trinidad (island)